TS Vanadis was a large steel yacht designed by Clinton Crane of Tams, Lemoine & Crane in New York, built at A. & J. Inglis, Pointhouse, Glasgow and launched in January 1908. She was rigged as a triple screw schooner and, unusually for the day, was originally powered by steam turbines. Capable of 16.4 knots at full speed, she was registered at 1,091 tons gross and measured  in length with a  beam.  After just two years she was repowered with a triple-expansion steam engine.

She was originally ordered by C.K.G. Billings, an industrialist and philanthropist residing in New York City. She was sold in 1916 to Morton F. Plant. She was then used by the Russian Navy under the name of Poryvs from 1917 to 1919. Sold to Baron de Linder and renamed Finlandia, in 1922 sold to the French yachtswoman Virginie Hériot. In 1925 she was bought by Lt. Cmdr. Montague Grahame-White for his charter business and renamed to Ianara. Sold for the last time in 1935, she was reportedly broken up in 1938.

References
Notes

Further reading
 Clinton H. Crane: Comparative results in steam and coal consumption with turbines, reciprocating engines and a combination of the two in the steam yacht Vanadis.

1908 ships
Ships built on the River Clyde